Shri Hit Harivansh Chandra Mahaprabhu (another spelling, Hita Harivaṃśa, 1509–1552) is a Braj-language bhakti poet-sant and the founder of Radha Vallabh Sampradaya. His principal work is the hymnal Hita-Caurāsī.

Born in Baad Graam (modern day Bad near Mathura on 11th Day of the Hindu month of Vaishakh (Ekadashi). He is considered as the incarnation of Lord Krishna (Hari) and Krishna's flute by the followers. A follower of Prema Bhakti and devotee of Radharani as the ultimate Supreme Power. His preaching of Radha and Radha-Krishna being Ek Pran Dou Deh—One Soul Two Bodies; has been the valuable asset of this Sampradaya (sect). The Temple of Shri Radhavallabh ji in Vrindavan, was established by him, and his followers  (hierarchy) are facilitating the Temple till today and is the center place for his followers in Vrindavan. The old temple of Shri Radhavallabh ji, just adjacent to the new temple has the first painting of Shri Hit Harivansh Ji. Shri Radha Vallabh Temple is one of the most famous temples of Krishna in Vrindavan including Shri Bankey Bihari Temple, Shri Govind Dev Ji Temple, Shri Radha Madan Mohan Temple, Shri Gopinath Temple, Shri Radha Raman Temple and Shri Radha Damodar Temple. He was the Guru of Jaimal Rathore, ruler of Martha State and brother of Mirabai.

Birth of Sri Hit Harivansh

Founder of the Sri Radhavallabh Sampradaya was Goswami Hit Harivansh Mahaprabhu who is regarded as the incarnation of Lord Krishna's flute. His father, Sri Vyasa Mishra, was a Gaur Brahman of Deoband in Saharanpur district of Uttar Pradesh, who was in service of the Mughal Emperor Humayun, according to 'Tarikh-I-Deoband' (Syed Mehboob Rizvi, Ilmi-Marqaz, and Deoband). On one occasion while Sri Vyas Mishra was accompanying Emperor on his march from Agra, his wife Tara Rani, gave birth to a son at the Royal Army Camp at village-Baad, near Mathura; on 11th day (Ekadashi) Monday of 'Baisakh'(April–May) in the Samvat 1530 corresponding to 10th.(Zilkad 878 Hijri). According to various Ephemeris, Solar, Lunar and Planetary, compiled and edited by eminent Foreign and Indian Chronologists like John Warren (1825), James Princep (1831), Robert Swell (1881). Hermann Jacobi (1888), L. D. Swemikennu Pillai (1911), V.B. Ketkar (1923), Gahlot and Devra for the years B.C.1 to 2000 A.D., on Vaishakh Shukla 11, Monday appears only during 1530 whereas in 1559 the day was Thursday. Zauhar Aftabchi, the Royal Diarist and Courtier of Humayun support this.

Celebrations after Sri Harivansh's birth

In grateful recognition of their answered prayers, the parents named the child after the God they had invoked, and called him 'Harivansh', i.e. Hari’s issue. The Emperor celebrated with pomp and splendor heralding the incarnation of the sacred flute of the Lord. Gulbadan Beghum, sister of the Emperor in her book 'Humayaunnama' (preserved in Gulistan Library at Tehran, capital of Iran) and Zohar Aftabchi in his book 'Tazkirat -ul-Wakiat' had described in detail that how for ten days there were festivities celebrated, profuse lightings, fireworks, feasts, etc., continued during this period. The Emperor, his Queen 'Mariam Makani' , his sister 'Gulbadan Beghum' , prominent courtiers Bairam Khan, Tardi Beg, Yaqoob Beg, Zohar Aftabchi, Baba, Khoja Ambar, etc. sent gifts and greetings to 'Pt. Mishra’s Alms were given to beggars and special gifts One part of the Royal caravan was staying at Serai, three 'Kos'(6 km.)away from 'Baad Gram' on Agra-Delhi Road, where also festivities in the honor of HIT Harivansh Mahaprabhu were celebrated on large scale for ten days supervised and managed by Abdul Majeed the Deewan of Mathura at the Royal expense. But on the order of Emperor, all the inmates of Royal caravan abstained from alcoholic drinks and non-vegetarian food during this period. To mark the serenity of the occasion, the Emperor ordered, that in future The Royal Armies should not camp at Baad, instead Farah was declared camping ground

Childhood days of Mahaprabhu
Hit Harivansh Mahaprabhu passed his childhood at Deoband a place of peace and divinity. Once playing with his playmates; the ball fell in a deep well. Mahaprabhu jumped into the well and came out with a 'Shri Vigraha'(Lord's idol). The well still exists and 'Sriji' placed in the ancestral palace, at Deoband is widely known as 'Sri Radha Navarangilalaji' here at Deoband. When he was eight years old Harivanshji's Yagyapaveet (Sacred Thread) ceremony was performed, and later he was married to Rukminiji, determined to abandon the world and lead the life of an ascetic.

Since then the replica was taken care of and served by all the generations. Next morning Hit Harivansh Mahaprabhu was married at a simple but solemn ceremony and the replica, named 'Radha Vallabhji' was gifted to him. Sri Hit Harivansh Mahaprabhu carried this deity, which on his arrival at Vrindavan was set up at Oonchi Thaur(High Cliff-Madan teer) on the bank of the Yamuna. This happened on the 13th day of bright fortnight in hindu month of Kartik widely celebrated as "Vrindavan Pragatya Divas" by the rasik saints.

Further Family of Harivanshji
Shri Harivansh Mahaprabhu is considered as an avatar of Shri Krishna’s Flute and hence considered as God himself. His child Shri Vanchandra is also considered as God who like him only wholesomely devoted himself to Radhavallabh ji. Further heredity is taking care of the temple and its properties.

Works
Hith Harivansh's principal work is the Hita-Caurāsī (a.k.a. Caurāsī Pad) — the eighty-four verses (hymns) in Braj Bhasha in praise of Radha.

References

Footnotes

Bibliography

External links
 About Shri Hit Harivansh Mahaprabhu by Radhavallabh.com

16th-century Hindu religious leaders
16th-century Hindu philosophers and theologians
16th-century Indian poets
Hindi-language poets
Vaishnavite religious leaders
Devotees of Krishna
Hindu poets
Indian male poets
Indian Hindu spiritual teachers
Indian Vaishnavites
Vaishnava saints
People considered avatars by their followers
People from Uttar Pradesh
Poets from Uttar Pradesh
Bhakti movement